A spin move in sports is a horizontal rotation of a player used as a tactical maneuver. 

"Spin move" may also refer to:

 Spin (b-boy move), a spinning movement in  b-boying (breakdancing)
 Spin Move Records, a recording label in Santa Monica, California, United States